The Apostolic Nunciature to East Timor is an ecclesiastical office of the Catholic Church in East Timor. It is a diplomatic post of the Holy See, whose representative is called the Apostolic Nuncio with the rank of an ambassador. The nunciature maintains an office in Dili; the nuncio normally holds other titles and resides in Indonesia or Malaysia. 

Pope Benedict XVI established the Nunciature to East Timor on 24 June 2003.

List of papal representatives to East Timor 
Apostolic Nuncios
Renzo Fratini (24 June 2003 – 27 January 2004)
Malcolm Ranjith (29 April 2004 – 10 December 2005)
Leopoldo Girelli (10 October 2006 – 16 January 2013)
Joseph Marino (16 January 2013 – 11 October 2019)
 Wojciech Załuski (29 September 2020 – present)

References

East Timor